Farmers Bank Building, also known as the Citizens Bank of Norborne, is a historic bank building in Norborne, Carroll County, Missouri.  It was built c. 1892, and is a two-story, Romanesque Revival style brick and cut-stone commercial building measuring 58 feet by 75 feet.

It was listed on the National Register of Historic Places in 1994.

References

Bank buildings on the National Register of Historic Places in Missouri
Romanesque Revival architecture in Missouri
Commercial buildings completed in 1892
Buildings and structures in Carroll County, Missouri
National Register of Historic Places in Carroll County, Missouri